Melaleuca calothamnoides is a plant in the myrtle family, Myrtaceae and is endemic to a relatively small area on the west coast of  Western Australia. It has attractive red and green flowering spikes and soft foliage but has proven to be difficult to grow in gardens.

Description
They are glabrous, fleshy, linear and almost circular in cross section with a blunt, curved tip.

The spikes occur on old wood and there are 40 to 60 flowers on each spike. The stamens are arranged in five bundles around the flowers with 4 to 5 stamens per bundle, and are usually green in the centre grading to red at the tips. Flowering occurs over an extended period from July to October.

Taxonomy and naming
Melaleuca calothamnoides was first formally described in 1862 by Ferdinand von Mueller in Fragmenta Phytographiae Australiae from a specimen found "in limestone hills near the Murchison River by Augustus Oldfield". The specific epithet (calothamnoides) refers to the similarity of this species to one in the genus Calothamnus. The ending -oides is a Latin suffix meaning "resembling" or "having the form of".

Distribution and habitat
This melaleuca occurs in the Murchison River area in the Geraldton Sandplains biogeographic region. It has a restricted distribution but is locally common, especially in dry gullies and creek beds.

Conservation status
Melaleuca calothamnoides is listed as "not threatened" by the Government of Western Australia Department of Parks and Wildlife.

Use in horticulture
The red and green flowering spikes and soft foliage of this shrub are particularly attractive but it is difficult to grow in the garden. It can be propagated easily from seed or cuttings but will only grow in well-drained, acidic soils.

References 

calothamnoides
Myrtales of Australia
Plants described in 1862
Endemic flora of Western Australia
Taxa named by Ferdinand von Mueller